The Association for International Broadcasting (AIB) is a not-for-profit, non-governmental trade association that represents international television and radio broadcasters and online broadcasters, founded in 1993. It is governed by an Executive Committee of six members elected from the AIB's membership. The AIB's Secretariat is located in Kent, in the United Kingdom.

Activities
Key areas of activity include: 
 media freedom
 cyber security
 sustainability
 regulatory affairs

The AIB provides its members with market intelligence, lobbying, networking and marketing support. It publishes an international media  news briefing reaching over 27,000 people worldwide.

The AIB has an immense collection of data about broadcasting and electronic media covering territories throughout the world.

The AIB runs an awards festival that celebrates the best in factual TV and radio broadcasting. Called the AIBs, this annual festival that was launched in 2005 and attracts entries from broadcasters and independent production companies on every continent and in many languages.

Members 

The following broadcasters, organisations, companies and TV and radio channels are members of the AIB.

References

External links

 Official site
 Official awards site

Broadcasting associations
Broadcasting in the United Kingdom
International broadcasting
Mass media in Kent
Organisations based in Kent
Organizations established in 1993
Borough of Tunbridge Wells